Aline Terry was an American tennis player active at the end of the 19th century. She was born in Princeton, New Jersey.

Terry won both the singles and the doubles title in the 1893 U.S. National Championships (now called the US Open) In the singles she defeated Augusta Schultz in two sets of 6–1 and 6–3, and she played the doubles with Harriet Butler defeating Augusta Schultz and M. Stone in two sets of 6–4 and 6–3. In 1894, as the defending singles champion, she automatically qualified for the final round in singles under the challenge rule; however, she lost against Helen Hellwig 5–7, 6–3, 0–6, 6–3 and 3–6.

According to Bud Collins there is little more known about Aline Terry other than that she did not compete in the championship again after 1894. According to the multiple-time champion Juliette Atkinson, Terry was as "soft as a cat on a banana and ran after the balls like a tiger."

Grand Slam finals

Singles (1 title)

Doubles (1 title)

References

19th-century American people
19th-century female tennis players
American female tennis players
People from Princeton, New Jersey
Sportspeople from Mercer County, New Jersey
Tennis people from New Jersey
United States National champions (tennis)
Year of birth missing
Year of death missing
Grand Slam (tennis) champions in women's singles
Grand Slam (tennis) champions in women's doubles